Prosto w serce (English: Straight Into the Heart) is the Polish version of the popular Argentinean soap opera Sos mi vida. It is broadcast on weekdays at 17:55 on TVN since Monday, January 3, 2011. The pilot episode was broadcast on Thursday, December 23, 2010 at 18:25 after the final episode of Majka.

Cast

References 

2011 Polish television series debuts
2011 telenovelas
Polish television soap operas
TVN (Polish TV channel) original programming